Blue Days Black Nights is the fifth album by singer-songwriter Freedy Johnston. It was released in 1999 on Elektra Records.

Reception
Rolling Stone's Rob Sheffield called Johnston "[a] complete singer-songwriter" who "[u]nlike your typical solo guitar guy… can actually sing." Concluding that "Blue Days Black Nights is his finest bag of tunes since the 1992 cult classic Can You Fly, on which his emotional folk rock really came together."

AllMusic's Jason Ankeny called the album Johnston's "darkest, most understated to date" and "the singer's most intimate effort, largely rejecting the quirky character studies of prior outings in favor of more plainly personal narratives, and revealing new shades of depth and honesty in the process." Concluding that "Blue Days Black Nights possesses a hushed gravity which insinuates itself only over repeated listens."

Track listing
All songs written by Freedy Johnston.
"Underwater Life" – 5:11
"The Farthest Lights" – 3:55
"While I Wait for You" – 3:33
"Pretend It's Summer" – 5:27
"Changed Your Mind" – 4:00
"Caught as You Look Away" – 3:26
"Moving on a Holiday" – 2:56
"Until the Sun Comes Back Again" – 3:02
"Depending on the Night" – 4:15
"Emily" – 4:27

Personnel
Freedy Johnston – vocals, guitar, piano
Cameron Greider – guitar, background vocals, tack piano
Andy Hess – bass
Jim Keltner – drums
Roger Moutenot – piano
Rich Pagano – drums
Mark Spencer – lap steel
Roy Nathanson – saxophone
Curtis Fowlkes – trombone
Rob Thomas – violin
Doug Petty – keyboards
Rufus Capodoccia – cello
Robin Lorentz – violin
Stephanie Fife – cello
Suzzy Roche – background vocals

References

1999 albums
Freedy Johnston albums
Elektra Records albums
Albums produced by T Bone Burnett